Nelson Park is a park in Vancouver, British Columbia. It was funded by the city charging development fees.  Nelson Park is located in Vancouver's West End, and is bounded by Nelson St., Bute St., Comox St. and Thurlow St.

References

External links

 

Parks in Vancouver
West End, Vancouver